AgencyNet is a digital marketing agency based in New York City and Fort Lauderdale, Florida. In November 2012, AgencyNet rebranded as AgencyTen.

Background 
AgencyNet is a digital marketing agency. The agency acts as a strategic marketing consultant to top brands in a variety of industries.

AgencyNet was founded in 1994 by Richard Lent in New York City. In 2000, the company moved to Fort Lauderdale, Florida. In 2008, the company expanded by opening another office New York City. The company has recently produced work for Jay-Z and Rihanna.

AgencyNet's clients include Bacardi, Grey Goose, Warner Bros, Ford, Sony, Howard Stern, Bill Clinton, Mike's Hard Lemonade, Pencils of Promise and Universal Music Group.

Named "one of the hottest digital agencies around" by Advertising Age, AgencyNet's work has been recipient of over 130 awards including an Interactive Emmy, FWA, Cannes Lion, SXSW's Best in Show, as well as The Webby.

References 

Advertising agencies of the United States